Mount Canopus is a prominent ice-free peak,  high, surmounting the western edge of the Nash Range,  east of Centaur Bluff. It was named by the New Zealand Geological Survey Antarctic Expedition (1960–61) after the bright star Canopus, used for survey fixes.

References 

Mountains of the Ross Dependency
Shackleton Coast